The Rogiet Hoard is a hoard of 3,778 Roman coins found at Rogiet, Monmouthshire, Wales in September 1998. The coins dated from 253 up until 295–296. The hoard notably contained several faulty issues, and some rare denominations, including those depicting the usurper emperors Carausius and Allectus.

Discovery and valuation
The hoard was discovered by metal detectorist Colin Roberts on 10 September, 1998 and, after a coroner's inquest in December, 1998 was declared a treasure. 

It was valued at £40,000 and is now owned by the National Museum and Galleries of Wales.

Items discovered
The hoard contained 3,778 silver radiates, including seven denarii, of which just over a third came from the reign of Probus (276–282). The latest coin was struck around 295–296. 

766 of the coins were struck during the reigns of the usurper emperors, Carausius, and his eventual murderer and successor, Allectus. Coins from these reigns are infrequently found in hoards, and several of them depicted Roman warships. Carausius also struck coins bearing the images of Diocletian and Maximian in order to ingratiate himself with them, and one example had all three men on it with the words "Carausius et fratres sui" (Carausius and his brothers). This example was described as "one of the finest specimens of this issue yet recorded". 

The hoard containing "significant numbers" of Allectus quinarii or Q-radiates, coupled with the total number of "improved issue" coins from the Aurelian to Diocletian reigns—after Aurelian's monetary reformation—made it an "unprecedented" single deposit from these categories. 

Another rare coin, a Divus Nigrinian, was remarked to be only the second recorded British example found.

See also
 List of hoards in Britain

References

External links

Treasure troves in Wales
Treasure troves of Roman Britain
History of Monmouthshire
Metal detecting finds in Wales
1998 archaeological discoveries
1998 in Wales
Hoards from Roman Britain